Tenjin Dam  is a rockfill dam located in Miyazaki Prefecture in Japan. The dam is used for irrigation. The catchment area of the dam is 10.2 km2. The dam impounds about 57  ha of land when full and can store 6700 thousand cubic meters of water. The construction of the dam was started on 1978 and completed in 2001.

See also
List of dams in Japan

References

Dams in Miyazaki Prefecture